The Port of Kashima (鹿島 港 Kashima-kō) is a Japanese seaport located in the cities of Kamisu and Kashima in Ibaraki Prefecture, Japan.

Port details 
Facing the Pacific Ocean, it runs from north to south, from Kashima to Kamisu in Ibaraki Prefecture, and is connected with an extensive port industrial zone, especially petrochemical and steel plants, for importing a quantity of raw materials from abroad and exporting a quantity of products. The administrator of the port is the Ibaraki Prefecture, based on the law on ports and based on the port regulations. 

The port was built in the area between lakes Kitaura and Sotonasakaura (Lake Kasumigaura) and the Kashima-nada coast.
In addition to fishing in the sea, the area is used for recreation, with a boat destined for that purpose. The port owns an observation tower in the "Port Park" in the city of Kamisu.

Main docks of the port 
 North Public Wharf (北 公共 埠頭)

 South Public Wharf (南 公共 埠頭)

 Fukashiba Public Wharf (深芝 公共 埠頭)

 Ammonia Quay (アンモニア 岸壁). During the March 11 earthquake and tsunami of 2011, most of the jetty at the ammonia pier was rendered unusable. In the year 2013 the restoration of the ammonia dock was completed.

Port of Kashima (鹿島 港). Plans and satellite views:

Main neighboring ports 
 Port of Ibaraki (茨城 港), port on the Pacific Ocean, located in the central and northern part of Ibaraki prefecture, is an international port for the import and export of products, which is based through the towns from north to south of Hitachi, Tōkai, Hitachinaka and Ōarai, as its main docks. The administrator of the port is the Ibaraki Prefecture.
 Fishing ports
 Hasaki Fishing Port (波 崎 漁港), located in the city of Kamisu, north of the mouth of the Tone River.
 Chōshi Fishing Port (銚 子 漁港), located in the town of Chōshi in neighboring Chiba Prefecture, south of the mouth of the Tone River. It is a very important fishing port in Japan.

Location 
The port is located in the southeast of Ibaraki Prefecture, and northeast of the metropolis of Tokyo; on the shores of the Pacific Ocean.

The location is Nippon - Ibaraki-ken - Kamisu-shi To Kashima-shi.

The administrative address of the port is Ports & Harbors Division, Ibaraki Prefectural Government, Kasaharacho 978-6, Mito 310-8555, Ibaraki Pref., Japan.

Land access from the port 
The Narita International Airport in the nearby city of Narita and the metropolis of Tokyo, is linked, among others, by the Higashi-Kantō Expressway.

Also to one side, there is the National Route 356 which runs parallel to the Tone River, and later connecting with Route 6, is another way to access Tokyo.

The National Route 51 is nearby and allows traveling parallel to the Pacific Ocean, north of the prefecture, having access to reach the capital of the prefecture, the city of Mito.

In addition, the nearby National Route 125 is connected to the production centers of the cities of Tsuchiura, Tsukuba, among others.

Notes

External links
 KASHIMA KO
 Ibaraki Prefecture Ports Department 

Ports and harbors of Japan
Transport in the Greater Tokyo Area
Transport in Ibaraki Prefecture
Buildings and structures in Ibaraki Prefecture